Robert Chase, M.D. is a fictional character on the Fox medical drama House. He is portrayed by Jesse Spencer. His character was a part of the team of diagnosticians who worked under Gregory House until the end of the third season when House fires him. However, he resumed work at the hospital as a surgeon, and was re-hired by House in season 6. Robert Chase is the longest-serving member of House's staff. Chase has been attracted to Allison Cameron since season 3 of the show and embarks on a romantic relationship with her in "Human Error." In "Post Mortem," he left the Diagnostic Team after realizing he was in the same position as he was 10 years earlier, unlike all of the other former members of the team. However, in the series finale, he rejoins the hospital as the new Head of Diagnostic Medicine, replacing the (supposedly) dead House.

Characterization
Chase is Australian and was born around the year 1979. His Czech father, Rowan Chase, was a wealthy and world-renowned rheumatologist who had emigrated to Australia from Czechoslovakia before Chase was born. Chase is portrayed as an enthusiastic follower of House during the first 3 seasons, often supporting his opinions and carrying out his orders without question. He was raised Catholic, and in the Season 1 episode "Damned If You Do," it was revealed that he attended seminary before becoming a doctor, but was kicked out for having sex with the wife of a groundskeeper. He seems to trust House the most and sometimes takes part in House's morally questionable plans when the other members of the team have refused, showing a situational application of ethics and a flexible stance on morality. This leads to heated arguments between Chase and Foreman, who is quick to disagree with House and eager to prove him wrong.

Chase is regarded by most characters as someone who will do anything to protect his job. This is mostly due to an incident in season one when Chase, fearing for his job after House had been made to fire someone from his team, told Edward Vogler of House's illegal actions.

However, as the show progresses, Chase begins to show his real trust and respect for House. Having been on the team longer than anyone else, Chase cares for House, as shown by the hug in the Season Three episode "Half-Wit." When Michael Tritter is looking for information about House, Chase refuses to work with him, although Tritter tries to make it appear that he does in order to create conflict and distrust within the Diagnostics Department. Tritter's manipulation works and his relationships with Cameron, Foreman and especially House are further strained.  However, after being punched by a detoxing House for getting the correct diagnosis in "Finding Judas" Chase begins to develop a more decisive personality and even disagrees with House on several occasions, eventually leading to him getting fired at the end of the third season. His affection for House is also exemplified in the fifth-season episode "The Social Contract," when he helps House give a patient potentially fatal surgery simply because House empathizes strongly with the patient's situation.

As a surgical critical care specialist, Chase performs most of the invasive medical procedures, as well as observing and helping with the team's patients' surgeries when he worked for House. After his departure from the team, Chase becomes a surgeon in the hospital, a move that House says is "only one step down" from his previous position. He is trained in hypnosis, using this to help House recover lost memories in "House's Head."

Perhaps because his mother "drank herself to death" (his own words) after his father left her, Chase was, early in the series,  quick to blame symptoms on drug or alcohol abuse. He also displays a strong cultural bias regarding the American obesity epidemic, particularly childhood obesity—in "Heavy," he initially believes that a morbidly obese girl's weight is the cause of all her other health problems until he realizes her weight is actually a symptom.

Chase has, at times, shown a shrewd capability of deducing people's motives, rather similar to House. He correctly deduced that Foreman was ashamed of the reason for his resignation, and then correctly deduced that House was also. He also figured out that House was the one who canceled Foreman's job interview in "The Jerk," for no reason other than to get the staff to mistrust and suspect each other. Nevertheless, he is very easily manipulated, and not just by House - for instance, in Autopsy, a nine-year old cancer patient manages to steal a kiss from him, something that causes him crippling embarrassment with the team later.

Education
He went to medical school doing his pre-medical studies at the University of Sydney (as revealed in Season 7). He later  completed specialties in Intensive Care and Cardiology; he also took a residency in Neurosurgery at Melbourne Hospital, although he never became a board certified neurosurgeon.

Concept and creation
When his agent suggested that Spencer audition for the role of Chase, he expected House to be a medical drama similar to General Hospital. However, he was impressed with the show once his agent showed him the scripts, and found out that Bryan Singer was producing the show. The character of Robert Chase was originally intended to be American, but was later changed to an Englishman: after taking the role, Spencer, who is Australian, persuaded the producers to change the character into an Australian because the accent was thought to add to the show.

References

External links
 Robert Chase on TVIV
 Fox's House Site

House (TV series) characters
Fictional Australian people
Fictional immigrants to the United States
Fictional physicians
Fictional surgeons
Television characters introduced in 2004